A Woman in Transit is a 1984 Canadian French-language drama film directed by Léa Pool.

Plot
Andrea Richler (Paule Baillargeon) is a well-known director who returns to her home town of Montreal to film a high-budget musical drama. At her hotel, she has a brief but unsettling encounter with a suicidal elderly woman named Estelle (Louise Marleau). This is briefly forgotten until later when she meets the old lady again and with mounting incredulity Andrea discovers that the actual events in the woman's life mirror the fictional events in the director's film.

Awards

References

External links
 
 

1984 films
1984 drama films
Canadian drama films
Films shot in Montreal
Films directed by Léa Pool
French-language Canadian films
1980s Canadian films